The 2021 Ulster Senior Football Championship is the 133rd installment of the annual Ulster Senior Football Championship organised by Ulster GAA. It is one of the four provincial competitions of the 2021 All-Ireland Senior Football Championship. The winning team received the Anglo-Celt Cup. The draw for the championship was made on 22 April 2021.

Teams
The Ulster championship is contested by the nine county teams in the province of Ulster.

Championship draw

Preliminary round
Two counties were randomly drawn to face each other in the preliminary round. The lowest ranked county to play in the preliminary round was Down of Division 2.

Quarter-finals
Seven counties were given a bye to this stage and were joined by the winning team from the preliminary round. The lowest ranked county to play in the semi-finals was Antrim of Division 4.

Semi-finals
The four quarter-finals winners advance to this stage. All four counties in the semi-finals were from Division 1.

Final

Tyrone advanced to the 2020 All-Ireland SFC semi-finals.

See also
 2021 All-Ireland Senior Football Championship
 2021 Connacht Senior Football Championship
 2021 Leinster Senior Football Championship
 2021 Munster Senior Football Championship

Notes

References

External links
 http://ulster.gaa.ie/

2U
2021 in Northern Ireland sport
Ulster Championship
Ulster Senior Football Championship